Mount Cameron is a  high hill in Hong Kong. Located within the Aberdeen Country Park, it was likely named for Major General William Gordon Cameron, British Army officer and former Administrator of Hong Kong.

A memorial for fallen Japanese soldiers was built during the occupation of Hong Kong on a nearby hill, northwest of Mount Cameron. It was later demolished in 1947. Its location is sometimes referred to as "Mount Cameron".

It is in Wan Chai District.

See also
 List of mountains, peaks and hills in Hong Kong
Victoria Peak
Mount Gough

References

External links

 gwulo.com entry about the Japanese War Memorial

Mountains, peaks and hills of Hong Kong
Southern District, Hong Kong
Wan Chai District